Hard Rock (sometimes Operation Hard Rock or the Hard Rock exercise) was a British civil defence exercise planned by the Conservative government to take place in September-October 1982.  One of a series of regular national civil defence exercises, it followed Square Leg in 1980.  As the public reaction to the scale of devastation forecast in Square Leg was poor the planner deliberately scaled down the number of warheads supposed for Hard Rock.  Despite this the Campaign for Nuclear Disarmament (CND), who opposed nuclear warfare and were against civil defence exercises, suggested that such as attack as Hard Rock anticipated would have led to the deaths of 12.5 million people.

Since 1980 many British local authorities, who played key roles in civil defence planning, had become nuclear-free zones, opposed to nuclear weapons and nuclear power.  Many of these authorities refused to take part in Hard Rock, though finance and the unofficial policy of the Labour Party also played a part.  By July 20 local authorities, all Labour-run, had indicated their refusal to take part and 7 more would only take part in a limited manner.  Hard Rock was postponed indefinitely, effectively cancelled.  In response the government passed the Civil Defence (General Local Authority Functions) Regulations 1983, compelling local authorities to take part in civil defence exercises.

Planning 
During this period the British government carried out national civil defence exercises every 2-3 years to test the country's preparedness for nuclear war.  Hard Rock was scheduled to be run in September-October 1982 and would have been the largest civil defence exercise for 15 years.  Planning for Hard Rock was started by the National Council for Civil Defence in 1980.

The attack scenario for the previous simulation, the 1980 Square Leg exercise, had been leaked to the press and the Campaign for Nuclear Disarmament (CND).  This scenario envisaged more than 200 megatons of nuclear weapons being detonated on the country, a quantity in line with all other British civil defence exercises since the 1970s.  The public response to the projected high casualty rates and widespread destruction  had been poor so the Hard Rock planner deliberately assumed an attack scenario with fewer weapons, totalling less than 50 megatons, and avoiding strikes on some obvious targets such as American air bases. 

Journalist and writer on Cold War military secrets Duncan Campbell noted that no missiles were assumed to be targeted at London, Manchester, Edinburgh, Liverpool, Bristol or Cardiff and those targetted at other cities were presumed to miss; in addition to the US bases, the British submarine bases at Holy Loch and Faslane and the main British and NATO  military control centres were also assumed not to be targets.  Campbell lists 54 targets in the final exercise scenario, down from 105 in a June 1981 plan.  He considers that the Home Office and Ministry of Defence had removed "politically undesirable" targets from the scenario.  He notes other political decisions affected the exercise: the scale of refugee movements was toned down and references to civil disorder kept vague.  The issue of the Protect and Survive booklet to the public was to one of the steps taken in the exercise but its brand had become so embarrassing to the government that it was referred to as the "'Public, Do-It-Yourself Civil Defence" booklet.

Even with fewer nuclear weapons the Hard Rock exercise projected largescale damage and loss of life.  The CND estimated that an attack of 50 megatons would result in the deaths of 12.5 million people, while an attack with 220 megatons would lead to the deaths of 39 million, some 72% of the population at the time.  The CND publicised these estimates under the codename "Hard Luck".  Campbell, using a model by Philip
Steadman of the Open University and Stan Openshaw of Newcastle University, forecast 12 million deaths or serious injuries, 2 million from the bombing and 5 million from the effects of fallout.

Exercise 
According to Campbell the exercise would have begun with a simulated transition to war period from 19 September, during which the officials in their bunkers would be given simulated daily briefings and news bulletins, including simulations of panic buying and fuel shortages.  A war with the Soviet Union was to have broken out at 4.30 am on 27 September with an invasion of West Germany and conventional air raids on the UK.  During this time the military had a limited role to play in the exercise, simulating reconnaissance flights over nuclear target areas and practicing moving ships in and out of ports scheduled to remain unaffected.  At 8pm on 2 October the exercise forecast the nuclear strike would begin, continuing into the following morning.  The exercise would run for a simulated one month post-attack period.

Exercise Hard Rock would have focussed on the response by local authorities in the aftermath of the attack.  It envisaged the abandonment of irradiated cities, where fires would be left to burn uncontrolled, and the breakdown of society into lawlessness.  The exercise included decisions made to triage casualties by likelihood of survival, with those affected by severe radiation sickness left to die without food or treatment, and the prioritisation of resources on those healthy adults with skills necessary to keep remaining infrastructure working.  Campbell records that all but 1,000 prisoners were to be released from jails.

Opposition and local authority refusals 

The running of the Hard Rock exercise was opposed by the CND who said it made no sense to run an exercise on post-attack response if the government's position was that the nuclear deterrent was effective. The pacifist Peace Pledge Union opposed the exercise on the grounds that "normalised militarism".

In 1980 Manchester City Council declared itself a nuclear-free zone, proclaiming nuclear weapons and nuclear power unwelcome within its boundaries.  It was the first British local authority to do so but by 1982 143 authorities had joined it.  Many of these authorities refused to participate in Hard Rock, though other concerns such as cost were also a factor.  Refusals were largely in local authorities controlled by the Labour Party, with some using it as an opportunity to demonstrate their opposition to the defence policies of the Conservative government.

The CND offered support to any authorities that decided not to participate and, with the Scientists Against Nuclear Arms orgnaisatio and the unofficial support of the Labour National Executive Committee (NEC), produced a pack of information outlying its views on the exercise.  As part of its opposition to Hard Rock the Greater London Council invited the public to view its secret nuclear bunkers, intended for post-attack command by civil defence personnel, with 4,800 people visited them in six days.

By July 1982 19 county councils and the Greater London Council, out of the 54 local authorities which had been asked to participate, had confirmed their refusal. During Prime Minister's Questions on 15 July the prime minister, Margaret Thatcher, stated that all 20 authorities that refused were Labour-run.  A further seven local authorities stated that they could comply in only a limited manner.  By September, the Home Secretary Willie Whitelaw had announced that the exercise had been indefinitely postponed, though it was, in effect, cancelled.

Legacy 
Despite other factors such as politics and finance, the CND believed the cancellation of Hard Rock was primarily because of its campaign.  The CND's Scottish secretary Ian Davison called it the organisation's first major victory and it has been called "probably the biggest single success of the peace movement".  The government blamed the Labour NEC for the cancellation.

In the wake of the cancellation of Hard Rock Michael Heseltine, secretary of state for defence, established Defence Secretariat 19 within the ministry to better explain to the public the government's policy on the nuclear deterrent and multilateral disarmament.  The government introduced the Civil Defence (General Local Authority Functions) Regulations in 1983.  These compelled local authorities to support national civil defence exercises and imposed financial penalties for them and individual councillors if they did not comply.  The regulations also gave the government the power to appoint special commissioners to run the exercises within the local authorities.

The civil service proposed running Hard Rock again after the Conservative victory in the 1983 general election but it was never run. That same year Labour peer Willie Ross, Baron Ross of Marnock claimed, in the House of Lords, that the Ministry of Defence was glad the exercise had been cancelled as it would have showed up widespread inadequacies in local civil defence planning.  A Home Office investigation in 1988 found a widespread refusal by local authorities to implement the Civil Defence (General Local Authority Functions) Regulations 1983.

Map of nuclear warhead targets 
The following map indicates, according to Duncan Campbell, the targets for nuclear warheads supposed in Hard Rock. Air burst detonation are shown with blue markers, ground burst detonations with red markers.

References 

Nuclear warfare
United Kingdom nuclear command and control
Cold War history of the United Kingdom
1982 in the United Kingdom